Epigloea is a genus of fungi in the monotypic family Epigloeaceae.

References

Ascomycota enigmatic taxa
Ascomycota families